The Cobbett's Weekly Political Register, commonly known as the Political Register, was a weekly London-based newspaper founded by William Cobbett in 1802. It ceased publication in 1836, the year after Cobbett's death.

History
Originally propounding Tory views, and costing a shilling, Cobbett changed his editorial line to embrace radicalism, such as advocating widening the suffrage. It had a large circulation for the time of 6,000 copies.

The government was alarmed by its radicalism and tried to prevent mass circulation by adding stamp duty on all newspapers, putting them out of reach of all but the wealthiest. From November 1816, Cobbett also published the Register in a cheap 2d. pamphlet, which kept political comment but evaded stamp duty by excising news. The price of the paper gave it the nickname "Two-Penny Trash;" nevertheless, it soon  gained a circulation of 40,000.

Cobbett began publishing Parliamentary Debates as a supplement to his Political Register in 1802. At the time it was illegal to report the proceeding of Parliament, only its ultimate decisions. He eventually extended his reportage back in time with the Parliamentary History. Cobbett's reports were printed by Thomas Curson Hansard from 1809. In 1812, with his business suffering, Cobbett sold the Debates section to Hansard.

Historical copies of Cobbett's Weekly Political Register, dating back to 1802, are available to search and view in digitised form at The British Newspaper Archive.

References

External links
Political Registers entry on the Spartacus website
William Cobbett & The Political Register - UK Parliament - Living Heritage
Sample image of Cobett's Political Register at The British Library website. Accessed May 2009

Defunct newspapers published in the United Kingdom
Defunct weekly newspapers
Publications established in 1802
Publications disestablished in 1836
1802 establishments in the United Kingdom
1836 disestablishments in the United Kingdom